Lieutenant Colonel Hugh C. S. Ashton was a British polo champion.

Biography
He won the Roehampton Trophy in 1920.

References

Roehampton Trophy
English polo players
Year of birth missing